SMY or smy may refer to:

People
 Jimmy Smy (1907–1997), English football player

Places
 SMY, the IATA code of Simenti Airport, Senegal
 St Mary Cray railway station, London, National Rail station code

Other
 smy, the ISO 639 code of Semnani language
 SmY RNA, found in some nematode worms